Qiu Shaoyun (June 1, 1926 – October 12, 1952) was a Chinese soldier, considered a war hero for his actions during the Korean War, when he sacrificed himself to keep his unit's position concealed during an ambush.

Early life
Qiu was born in 1931 in a small village named Qiūjiāgōu (邱家沟) in Guānjiàn township (关溅乡) (now called Shàoyún town, 少云镇) of Tongliang County, Sichuan Province (part of Chongqing since 1997). He was born into a very poor peasant family. When he was 9 years old, his father died; two years later, he lost his mother. He began work as a farm laborer when he was 14.

After the Chinese Civil War, Shaoyun joined the People's Liberation Army in 1949. In early 1951, Qiu joined the People's Volunteer Army to take part in the Korean War.

Death

During a counterattack on United Nations Command positions that occupied No. 391 highland, west to Kimhua, on October 11, 1952, Qiu and his platoon were ordered to set up an ambush at the mountain's foot, 60 meters away from the enemy. They were to reach the location at night and assist a main force with defeating the enemy position; per ambush discipline, they could not reveal their positions. Qiu and his squad mates crawled to the enemy position overnight, using hay and twigs as natural camouflage; Qiu himself was positioned near a stream.

At noon on October 12, UN forces used incendiary bombs, reportedly dropped by aircraft and thrown by soldiers, to try and smoke out the Chinese units; one of the bombs landed near Qiu, sparking a brush fire and setting him ablaze. Despite being able to easily roll into the nearby stream and extinguish himself, Qiu chose to remain where he was to avoid revealing the presence of him and his unit, which would make the ambush a failure. Qiu did not move or make a noise and burned to death, allowing his unit to remain hidden and reportedly ensuring the ambush went successfully.

Awards
On November 6, 1952, Qiu Shaoyun was posthumously awarded a Special-Class Merit citation. His body was buried in the Cemetery of the Volunteers in Shenyang in March 1953. On June 1, 1953, Qiu was further honored as a "First-Class Hero of the Chinese People's Volunteers Army". He was posthumously awarded the title of "First-Class Hero of the Chinese People's Volunteers" on June 1, 1953. He was also awarded the title of "Hero of the Democratic People's Republic of Korea", and won a Gold-Star Medal and a First-Class Medal of National Flag on June 25. Afterwards, people in Tongliang County, Sichuan Province established a memorial and a cenotaph for Qiu Shaoyun.

Memorial Hall
The Qiu Shaoyun Memorial Hall, located at Tongliang County of Sichuan Province and opened to the public in October 1962, is a museum of Chinese revolutionary figures, including Qiu. The monument to Qiu  stands in front of the memorial. It is 10 meters tall with "Monument to Martyr Qiu Shaoyun" engraved in the front of the monument and his biography on the back. On the top of the monument stands a 5-meter-tall sculpture of Qiu, and in the front of the pedestal is a relief pattern composed of a golden star medal, an olive branch, and a submachine gun. The exhibition hall of Qiu Shaoyun's deeds takes up an area of 1,700 square meters, consisting of the vestibule, a showroom of paintings and calligraphies, and four exhibition rooms. On display are more than 190 historical relics about his life, such as the things left behind by the martyr, pictures, the inscriptions of leaders of the central authorities, the certificate and medal bestowed by Chairman Kim-il Sung of the Korean Government as well as the gifts presented to the martyr's dependents.

Remembrance
On October 25, 2010, a ceremony has been held in southwest Chongqing Municipality to commemorate Qiu. 500 people paid tribute at the Monument to  Qiu Shaoyun in Tongliang County, his hometown.

See also 

 Dong Cunrui
 Hunan Avetisyan
 Huang Jiguang

References

External links 
 http://english.chinamil.com.cn/site2/special-reports/2007-07/12/content_875782.htm 
 https://web.archive.org/web/20120929090648/http://www.chinaculture.org/library/2008-01/18/content_30254.htm

1926 births
1952 deaths
Chinese military personnel of the Korean War
Propaganda in China
Chinese military personnel killed in action
Chinese military personnel killed in the Korean War
People from Chongqing
People of the Republic of China
National Heroes of North Korea